Paul de Vigne (1843–1901), Belgian sculptor, was born on 26 April 1843 at Ghent. He created public monuments for display in Belgium and France.

He was trained by his father, a statuary, and began by exhibiting his Fra Angelico da Fiesole at the Ghent Salon in 1868. Among his contemporaries, Vigne, a classic sculptor, has the purest style, and the most anxious desire for harmonious perfection. His early works reflect the inspiration of Italian art, particularly that of Florence in the 14th and 15th centuries.

In 1872 he exhibited at the Brussels Salon a marble statue, Heliotrope (Ghent Gallery), and in 1875, at Brussels, Beatrix and Domenica. He was employed by the government to execute caryatides for the ornate facade of the Royal Conservatory of Brussels.  In 1876 at the Antwerp Salon he had busts of Emmanuel Hiel and W. Wilson, which were afterwards placed in the communal museum at Brussels. Until 1882 he lived in Paris, where he produced the marble statue Immortality (Brussels Gallery), and The Crowning of Art, a bronze group on the façade of the Palais des Beaux-Arts at Brussels. His monument to the popular heroes, Jan Breydel and Pieter de Coninck, was unveiled at Bruges in 1887.

At his death he left unfinished his principal work, the Anspach monument, which was erected at Brussels under the direction of the architect Janlet with the co-operation of various sculptors. Among other notable works by De Vigne are Volumnia (1875); Poverella (1878); a bronze bust of Psyche (Brussels Gallery), of which there is an ivory replica; the marble statue of Marnix de Ste Aldegonde on the Sablon Square, Brussels; the Metdepenningen monument in the cemetery at Ghent; and the monument to Canon de Haerne at Kortrijk.

References

 E. L. Detage, Les Artistes Belges contemporains (Brussels), and 0. G. Destrhe, The Renaissance of Sculpture in Belgium (London, 1895).

1843 births
1901 deaths
Artists from Ghent
Belgian architectural sculptors